Témacine is a district in Touggourt Province, Algeria. It was named after its capital, Témacine. It is one of the smallest districts in the province. As of the 2008 census, the district had a population of 34,607.

Municipalities
The district is further divided into two communes:
Témacine
Balidat Ameur

References

Districts of Ouargla Province